Pompeo Magno (Pompeius Magnus) is an opera in three acts by Francesco Cavalli. It was designated as a dramma per musica. The Italian libretto was by Nicolò Minato.

Performance history
It was first performed in Venice at the Teatro San Salvatore on 20 February 1666.

Roles

References
Sources

Clinkscale, Martha Novak,  "Pompeo Magno" , The New Grove Dictionary of Opera, ed. Stanley Sadie (London, 1992) 

Operas
Operas by Francesco Cavalli
1666 operas
Cultural depictions of Pompey
Depictions of Julius Caesar in opera
Italian-language operas